Lowa Khatsa is a dish in Tibetan cuisine.  It is made of pieces of fried animal lung.

References

External links
 Blog description and photograph of Lowa Khatsa

Tibetan cuisine
Lung
Offal